The 1913 Harvard Crimson football team was an American football team that represented Harvard University as an independent during the 1913 college football season. In its sixth season under head coach Percy Haughton, the Crimson compiled a perfect 9–0 record, shut out five of nine opponents, and outscored all opponents by a total of 225 to 21. The season was part of an unbeaten streak that began in November 1911 and continued until October 1915.

There was no contemporaneous system in 1913 for determining a national champion. However, Harvard was retroactively named as the national champion by the Helms Athletic Foundation, Houlgate System, and National Championship Foundation, and as a co-national champion with Chicago by Parke H. Davis.

Four Harvard players were consensus first-team selections on the 1913 All-American football team: halfback Eddie Mahan, fullback Charles Brickley, guard Stan Pennock, and tackle Harvey Rexford Hitchcock Jr. Other notable players included ends Huntington Hardwick and Francis Joseph O'Brien and tackle Robert Treat Paine Storer. Mahan, Pennock, and Hardwick were all inducted in the 1950s into the College Football Hall of Fame.

Schedule

References

Harvard
Harvard Crimson football seasons
College football national champions
College football undefeated seasons
Harvard Crimson football
1910s in Boston